Huglfing is a municipality in the Weilheim-Schongau district, in Bavaria, Germany.

Transport
The district has a railway station, on the Munich–Garmisch-Partenkirchen railway.

References 

Weilheim-Schongau